The Town of Flagler is a Statutory Town in western Kit Carson County, Colorado, United States. The town population was 567 at the 2020 United States Census. Flagler is near Exit 395 on I-70 and about 120 miles east of Denver and Colorado Springs.

History
The town was established in 1888 as a small settlement near the then-new Rock Island Railroad. The area has had several names, and prior to the settlement of the town, the location had been home to a combined general store and post office, owned by W.H. Lavington, and named Bowser in memory of the owner's favorite dog who had died. When the town was founded, the town was named Malowe after Rock Island Railroad attorney M. A. Lowe. The town was later renamed after Henry Flagler, railroad builder and oil man, at the request of his daughter who liked the area.

The town was officially incorporated in 1916.

Geography
Flagler is located at  (39.294031, -103.065832).

Demographics

As of the census of 2000, there were 612 people, 271 households, and 171 families residing in the town. The racial makeup of the town was 96.57% White, 2.29% Native American, 0.33% from other races, and 0.82% from two or more races. Hispanic or Latino of any race were 3.10% of the population.

There were 271 households, out of which 29.9% had children under the age of 18 living with them, 50.9% were married couples living together, 9.2% had a female householder with no husband present, and 36.9% were non-families. 35.1% of all households were made up of individuals, and 17.3% had someone living alone who was 65 years of age or older.  The average household size was 2.23 and the average family size was 2.88.

In the town, the population was spread out, with 25.8% under the age of 18, 5.7% from 18 to 24, 23.2% from 25 to 44, 23.4% from 45 to 64, and 21.9% who were 65 years of age or older.  The median age was 42 years. For every 100 females, there were 91.3 males.  For every 100 females age 18 and over, there were 83.1 males.

The median income for a household in the town was $28,523, and the median income for a family was $43,542. Males had a median income of $29,821 versus $19,500 for females. The per capita income for the town was $16,770.  About 4.3% of families and 8.1% of the population were below the poverty line, including 9.3% of those under age 18 and 7.3% of those age 65 or over.

Economy 
 The economy of Flagler and the surrounding area is composed largely of agriculture, specifically wheat and corn production. Flagler is also the self-proclaimed "Birdseed Capital of World," with a Wagner's Wild Bird Seed plant listed as the town's top private employer. Flagler is home to a Loaf 'N Jug convenience store, The Witt's Family (clothing and shoe) Store, Stone Communications (previously Lyle's TV & Radio), a small hotel, a small movie house, a local supermarket, The I-70 (1950's) Diner, and numerous churches. The Flagler area is also home to the Mullen pedal steel guitar factory on County Road
MM, about 30 miles N.E. of the town

The Town of Flagler is offering free land for business or industry.

School 
Arriba-Flagler Consolidated School District #20 educates local children in grades preschool through 12th, as well as children from nearby Arriba, Colorado. The school's mascot is the panther, and students compete in sports such as Six-man football, volleyball, basketball, baseball, and track. Flagler's archrival is the Stratton Eagles, which Flagler beat to end what was, at the time, the longest winning streak in Colorado high school football history. Flagler Senior High School is represented by the colors orange and black, and is consistently one of the top-performing schools in the state academically .

Notable events
Flagler is the site of a tragic air show accident that occurred on September 15, 1951.  A stunt aircraft performing for Fall Festival Day lost control and impacted the show's spectators, killing twenty people.

Notable residents
Boxer Irish Bob Murphy was born in Flagler.
Author Hal Borland moved to Flagler at the age 15 when his father became publisher of one of the local newspapers, and attended high school in Flagler.
William Henry “W.H.” Lavington came to Kit Carson County, Colorado in 1888 by Rock Island Railroad and developed Flagler along with his partner and brother-in-law, W.L. Price. Notable projects included the first general store and combined post office, Flagler State Bank, and the Hotel Flagler built in 1909. The hotel has been placed on the National Register of Historic Places by the United States Department of the Interior; it later became the Flagler Hospital, a private hospital headed by W.L. McBride, and now serves as the Town Hall and library. W.H. was President of the Flagler State Bank, held the office of Commissioner of Kit Carson County from 1893 to 1895, and served as Postmaster of Flagler from 1889 to 1894. His wife, Louelia Isabel "Ella" (Van Heusen) Lavington, had the first child born in Flager. Ella worked alongside W.H. and served on the School Board of Education for Flagler County Public Schools.
Hon. Leon Edward Lavington, Sr., was the first child born in Flagler to William Henry “W.H.” and Louella Isabel “Ella” (Van Heusen) Lavington. He graduated from the University of Colorado in 1915 before entering the United States WWI Draft Registration of 1917. When the town was incorporated, he was the first Mayor of Flagler, and served as President of the First National Bank of Flagler (previously the Flagler State Bank). Initially appointed by Governor Ralph Lawrence Carr to a civil service commission, State Purchasing Agent, Leon Lavington was elected Auditor of the State and Colorado State Treasurer, before running for Governor (R 1946). The third largest blizzard in recorded state history preceded the gubernatorial election which resulted in a less than 30 percent voter turn-out (Historical Blizzard, November 2–4, 1946, 30.4 inches). The election was lost by a small margin having won nearly 48 percent of the vote. Lavington Park is named in his honor. His wife, Marjorie (Dixon) Lavington, graduated from the University of Colorado at Boulder, class 1914 and Pi Beta Phi member. She also served as a Former Chairman of the Red Cross Gray Ladies of Denver. Leon died of a heart attack on December 13, 1961, in Denver, Colorado at age 72.  They are buried in the Fairmount Cemetery.
Leon Edward Lavington, Jr. was former City Councilman and Mayor of Flagler. He was a track star and lettered in football at Denver's East High School. He lettered in football again at the University of Colorado at Boulder in 1935, 1936, and 1937 (#17, Defensive End). He played in the University's first “bowl” game appearance, during the 1938 Cotton Bowl against Rice University. In 1938, Leon and teammates, United States Supreme Court Justice Byron “Whizzer” White (succeeded by Ruth Bader Ginsburg), and Gene Moore, were drafted by the National Football League (NFL). They were the first players in the history of the University of Colorado to have been drafted. Leon was chosen by the Chicago Cardinals (Draft: Round 8, #65 Overall, End Position). Leon Jr. died in 1959 at the age of 42. He is buried alongside his wife, Louise (Brourink) Lavington, at the Olinger Crown Hill Cemetery in Wheat Ridge, Colorado. Their children include Leon Edward Lavington III with grandchildren and extended family continuing the multi-generational tradition as CU Boulder alumni and engage in public service throughout the state, including the Colorado Department of Education and civil servant positions within Colorado's 4th congressional district.
 Larry Lloyd McIrvin, father-in-law of Edmond Chow

See also

Colorado
Bibliography of Colorado
Index of Colorado-related articles
Outline of Colorado
List of counties in Colorado
List of municipalities in Colorado
List of places in Colorado

References

External links

Town of Flagler website
CDOT map of the Town of Flagler

Towns in Kit Carson County, Colorado
Towns in Colorado
Populated places established in 1888
1888 establishments in Colorado